In Canada, field hockey is generally restricted to spring, summer and early autumn seasons, except in southwestern British Columbia, where it can be played year-round. It is principally a girls' sport in schools, but is played by both men and women in adult leagues across the country. The national governing body for the sport is Field Hockey Canada.

In the late 1990s, registered membership was just over 10,000 (8,200 women and 1,200 men) and the estimated total playing population, including school players, was 30,000.

The modern form of field hockey was first played in Canada in British Columbia. In 1896, the first recorded match in Canada was played by Vancouver girls, and the Vancouver Ladies Club was formed. Men were also playing at the turn of the century in Vancouver and Victoria, and a Vancouver League came into existence in 1902. The first women's organization in Canada was formed in Vancouver in 1927.

International contests have increased markedly since the 1950s. The Canadian women's team participated in the women's international tournament for the first time in 1956. In 1979 Canada hosted 18 countries in Vancouver for that world event; Canada placed 8th. The 1978 Canadian team was the first to enter the Women's World Cup, placing 5th.

See also
 Canada men's national field hockey team
 Canada women's national field hockey team